The Buckeye Local School District (Ashtabula County) is a public school district in Ashtabula County, Ohio, United States, based in Ashtabula, Ohio.

Schools
The Buckeye Local School District (Ashtabula County) has two elementary schools, one middle school, and one high school.

Elementary schools
Kingsville Elementary School
Ridgeview Elementary School

Middle school
Braden Middle School

High school
Edgewood Senior High School

References

External links

School districts in Ohio
Education in Ashtabula County, Ohio